Bradley Webster Palmer (June 28, 1866 – November 9, 1946) was a prominent U.S. attorney and businessman. He was involved with the creation and development of multiple corporations, including the United Fruit Company, Gillette Safety Razor Corp., and International Telephone & Telegraph Corporation. He was also part of the American delegation at the Paris Peace Conference following the First World War.

From 1937 to 1944, Palmer donated his extensive land holdings to the state of Massachusetts. These lands today make up the  Bradley Palmer State Park in Topsfield, Massachusetts.

Biography

Family background
The American Palmers in Palmer's ancestral line came from William Palmer, Nottinghamshire, who was possibly one of the original Scrooby congregation of puritan separatists. He sailed on the vessel Fortune in 1621 from Plymouth, England, to Plymouth, Massachusetts, settling finally in Duxbury. His grandfather on his father's side, Gideon, moved to Pennsylvania 

Palmer was born on June 28, 1866, in Wilkes-Barre, Pennsylvania. His father was Henry W. Palmer, who served as Attorney General of the State of Pennsylvania, 1879–1883, and a member of the U.S. House of Representatives, 1901–1907 and 1909. His mother, Ellen W. Palmer, was an essential figure in fighting for the rights of breaker boys in Pennsylvania. She promoted child literacy and appropriate wages, equal to those of adults for the work done by the boys. Until the 1990s a statue of Ellen Palmer stood on the city commons in Wilkes-Barre.

Education
Palmer's parents sent him to Phillips Exeter Academy in New Hampshire, where he was admitted at the age of 16 in 1882. At Exeter, Palmer was involved in The Exonian, debate club, the Christian Fraternity, and the G. L. Soule Literary Society, as well as playing tennis, baseball, and lacrosse, and being his class secretary. From there he went immediately to Harvard University, receiving an AB in 1888. He was a treasurer of the Harvard Lampoon and a member of the Hasty Pudding Club. He played football and baseball for his class teams, and he was a member of the Institute of 1770 (later merged with the Hasty Pudding Club), Delta Kappa Epsilon, the Historical Club, the Finance Club, the St. Paul's Society, and the Varsity Club. He stayed on an extra year in Harvard University School of Law, earning the AM in 1889. He was a proctor that year. Returning to Wilkes-Barre he went to work in his father's law office there in 1889 at the age of 23 and passed the bar in Pennsylvania in 1890. He returned to Boston in 1891 and passed the bar in Massachusetts the following year.

Legal career
Until 1899 Palmer's chief work in the firm of Storey, Thorndike and Palmer had been to check the legality of bonds and then to handle the legal business of the Boston Fruit Company, the company of Andrew W. Preston, a Boston banana importer. In that year, however, he created the United Fruit Company by a merger of Preston's firm and the banana import business of Minor Cooper Keith. He became a director and a permanent member of the executive committee, while his law partners were listed as executives. Their first move was to buy outright or buy an interest in 14 competitors. They now had a monopoly on the Costa Rican banana import business and controlled 80% of the entire business in the United States. These moves under Palmer's tutelage brought instant wealth to everyone concerned. The profits in 1899 were 1.6 million, and were up to 6.2 million by 1907. For all business purposes, Palmer was United Fruit. When the first anti-trust suit was brought against United Fruit in 1909, charging that it had created a monopoly and was using its financial interests in the competition (in this case the Bluefields Steamship Company) to suppress their business, Palmer, as secretary, was named along with Preston and Keith, the president and vice president.

Palmer was a lawyer and partner with multiple Boston-based corporations, including the United Fruit Company (which controlled large land holdings and agriculture in Central America), Gillette, and ITT Corporation.  He was possibly an attorney for Sinclair Oil during the Teapot Dome scandal.

Personal life
Palmer never married, but was involved in the social life of the North Shore of Massachusetts, which is relatively densely populated with horse farms. He belonged to Myopia Hunt Club in Hamilton, Massachusetts, known for its equestrianism. Palmer hosted club events on his estate. Palmer died in 1946.

Palmer enjoyed numerous individualisms, such as smoking a cigar with the end stuck in a pipe bowl.

Public service
During WWI, Palmer's career took a brief break from his legal career. In December 1917, Palmer went to Washington D. C. and joined the office of Alien Property Custodian, which was charged with the investigation of attempts by German nationals to conceal their extensive property of all sorts in the United States, and with the confiscation and disposition of this property. Where he did both investigations and dispositions, mainly by sale, for which legal expertise was required. All of members of the APC served without pay. He also was appointed as counsel to the Capital Issues Committee. In 1918 he was also appointed to an advisory committee supporting the Federal Reserve Board, also serving without pay. He was the board's lawyer.

After the War, Palmer continued serving his country after being appointed by President Wilson to the delegation to the Paris Peace Conference. Wilson chose Palmer because of his experience with the Alien Property Custodian. In Palmer's own words: "At the end of the War, President Wilson required someone familiar with the operations of the Alien Property Custodian to attend the peace conferences in Paris. He selected me. I had no official title, but was assigned as the representative of the United States to several sub-committees whose duty was to prepare the provisions of the treatise of economic character. Our sphere covered restoration of business relations, adjustment of private contracts, property rights and interests, and similar considerations." The elements negotiated by Palmer and his fellow economic delegates made it into the separate U.S.–German Peace Treaty in 1921. For his work during the Paris Peace Conference, Palmer was decorated by France, Belgium, and Romania, as well as receiving a letter of commendation from the United States government. He then returned home and began practicing law again.

Land holdings

Beginning in 1891 Palmer began to acquire land. An equestrian and nature-lover, he continued to purchase land as he accumulated the means.  At one point, he owned over 10,000 acres (40 km2) on the North Shore of Massachusetts in towns such as Boxford, Georgetown, Hamilton, Ipswich, Rowley, and Topsfield.

This would become the estate in which he resided, known as Willow Dale. The mansion was built in 1902 by Charles K. Cummings, who described the original structure as having, a rather unusual arrangement, the master’s house, the quarters for a farmer or caretaker, and the stable, all being joined together under one roof. This was done with a view to economy of construction and management; and especially during the winter months this grouping together of quarters, which more often appear as separate buildings, has been found convenient and agreeable In 1915, Palmer renovated the mansion, moving the stables and coach house to separate buildings and replacing them with a dining room and ballroom respectively. He also added an addition for a screened patio, guest rooms, and servants quarters. This ultimately gave Willowdale the form it has today.

By 1944, Palmer had donated all of his land holdings in Massachusetts to the Commonwealth, leasing back the  surrounding his mansion. The estate is now incorporated as part of the Bradley Palmer State Park. The mansion became a civil defense training academy, before it fell into disrepair and was eventually leased for renovation by the Department of Conservation and Recreation. Today it is operated as a premier events venue under the name Willowdale Estate.

Death
Palmer died on November 9, 1946, due to an unspecified pulmonary illness. His body lay in state at Willow Dale before processing to Wilkes-Barre, PA. He was interred in Hollenback Cemetery with his mother and father. Their tombstone also contains a memorial to Palmer's brother, Henry Palmer, who had died at sea six days before Palmer.

References

Bibliography
 
 

1864 births
1948 deaths
Harvard Law School alumni
Phillips Exeter Academy alumni